Redistricting in the United States is the process of drawing electoral district boundaries.  For the United States House of Representatives, and state legislatures, redistricting occurs after each decennial census. 

The U.S. Constitution in Article 1, Section 2, Clause 3 provides for proportional representation in the House of Representatives. The Reapportionment Act of 1929 required that the number of seats in the U.S. House of Representatives be kept at a constant 435, and a 1941 act made the reapportionment among the states by population automatic after every decennial census. Reapportionment occurs at the federal level followed by redistricting at the state level. In most states redistricting is subject to political maneuvering, but some state legislatures have created independent commissions.

The Uniform Congressional District Act (enacted in 1967) requires that representatives be elected from single-member districts. When a state has a single representative, that district will be state-wide. 

Gerrymandering in the redistricting process has been a problem since the early days of the republic. In recent years, critics have argued that redistricting has been used to neutralize minority voting power. Supporters say it enhances electoral competitiveness.

Legislative representatives

Federal

Six states have a single representative in the United States House of Representatives, because of their low populations. These are Alaska, Delaware, North Dakota, South Dakota, Vermont, and Wyoming. These states do not need redistricting for the House and elect members on a state-wide at-large basis.

In 25 states, the state legislature has primary responsibility for creating a redistricting plan, in many cases subject to approval by the state governor. To reduce the role that legislative politics might play, thirteen states (Alaska, Arizona, California, Colorado, Hawaii, Idaho, Michigan, Missouri, Montana, New Jersey, Ohio, Pennsylvania, and Washington) determine congressional redistricting by an independent or bipartisan redistricting commission. Five states: Maine, New York, Rhode Island, Vermont, and Virginia give independent bodies authority to propose redistricting plans, but preserve the role of legislatures to approve them. Arkansas has a commission composed of its governor, attorney general, and secretary of state.  

By law, the forty-three states with more than one representative must redistrict after each decennial census to account for population shifts within the state as well as (when necessary) to add or remove congressional districts. States are not prevented from redistricting at any time between censuses up to and including redistricting prior to each congressional election, provided such redistricting conforms to various federal laws. However, "mid-decade" redistricting proposals (such as what occurred in 2003 in Texas) have typically been highly controversial.  Another  case of between-censuses redistricting occurred between the 2016 and 2018 elections, in Pennsylvania.

State
State constitutions and laws also mandate which body has responsibility over drawing the state legislature boundaries. In addition, those municipal governments that are elected on a district basis (as opposed to an at-large basis) also redistrict.

Redistricting criteria
The Reapportionment Act of 1929 did not state any size and population requirements for congressional districts, last stated in the Apportionment Act of 1911, since the 1911 Act was still in force. However, the Supreme Court ruled that the 1911 Act was no longer in force even though Congress never repealed it. The previous apportionment acts required districts be contiguous, compact, and equally populated.

Each state can set its own standards for congressional and legislative districts. In addition to  equalizing the population of districts and complying with federal requirements, criteria may include attempting to create compact, contiguous districts, trying to keep political units and communities within a single district, and avoiding the drawing of boundaries for purposes of partisan advantage or incumbent protection.

Redistricting may follow other criteria depending on state and local laws:
 compactness
 contiguity
 equal population
 preservation of existing political communities
 partisan fairness
 racial fairness

Gerrymandering

Gerrymandering, the practice of drawing district boundaries to achieve political advantage for legislators, involves the manipulation of district boundaries to leave out, or include, specific populations in a particular district to ensure a legislator's reelection or to advantage their party.

In states where the legislature (or another body where a partisan majority is possible) is in charge of redistricting, the possibility of gerrymandering (the deliberate manipulation of political boundaries for electoral advantage, usually of incumbents or a specific political party) often makes the process very politically contentious, especially when the majorities of the two houses of the legislature, or the legislature and the governor, are from different parties. 

Partisan domination of state legislatures and improved technology to design contiguous districts that pack opponents into as few districts as possible have led to district maps which are skewed towards one party. Consequently, many states including Florida, Georgia, Maryland, Michigan, North Carolina, Ohio, Pennsylvania, Texas and Wisconsin have succeeded in reducing or effectively eliminating competition for most House seats in those states. Some states, including New Jersey and New York, protect incumbents of both parties, reducing the number of competitive districts. 

The state and federal court systems are often involved in resolving disputes over congressional and legislative redistricting when gridlock prevents redistricting in a timely manner. In addition, those disadvantaged by a proposed redistricting plan may challenge it in state and federal courts. Justice Department approval (which is known as pre-clearance) was formerly required under Section 5 of the Voting Rights Act of 1965 in certain states that have had a history of racial barriers to voting. The Supreme Court's ruling on the Pennsylvania redistricting effectively allows elected officials to select their constituents by eliminating most of the grounds for constituents to challenge district lines.

U.S. Supreme Court redistricting cases 

 Colegrove v. Green (1946)
 Baker v. Carr (1962) — federal courts may review redistricting of state legislative districts 
 Gray v. Sanders (1963) — 14th Amendment's equal protection clause requires “one person, one vote” standard
 Wesberry v. Sanders (1964) — legislative districts for the U.S. House of Representatives must be composed, to the extent practicable, of equal numbers of eligible voters
 Burns v. Richardson (1966)
 Reynolds v. Sims (1964)
 Gaffney v. Cummings (1973)
 Karcher v. Daggett (1983)
 Thornburg v. Gingles (1986)
 Davis v. Bandemer (1986)
 Growe v. Emison (1993)
 Voinovich v. Quilter (1993)
 Shaw v. Reno (1993)
 Johnson v. DeGrandy (1994)
 Miller v. Johnson (1995)
 Bush v. Vera (1996)
 Hunt v. Cromartie (1999)
 Vieth v. Jubelirer (2004)
 League of United Latin American Citizens v. Perry (2006)
 Bartlett v. Strickland (2009)
 Arizona State Legislature v. Arizona Independent Redistricting Commission (2015)
 Gill v. Whitford (2018)
 Benisek v. Lamone (2018 & 2019)
 Rucho v. Common Cause (2019)

See also
 Boundary commissions (United Kingdom)
 United States congressional apportionment

Notes

References

Further reading
 . (About U.S. congressional districting)

External links
All About Redistricting Includes state criteria.
redistrictinginamerica.org A comprehensive source for information about redistricting in all fifty states from the Rose Institute of State and Local Government
MappingSoftware.com Maptitude for Redistricting News
Congressional Apportionment from the Office of the Clerk at the United States House of Representatives, including historical representation by state
District sizes and other data from 1900-2000 from the United States Census
Government Redistricting Web Sites from GovDocs at Purdue University Libraries, includes list of state websites
Public Mapping Project
A Citizen's Guide to Redistricting, 2010 Edition, downloadable 
Reapportionment and Redistricting in the U.S. from the ACE Project 
 Rodriguez, Lori. "Getting point of redistricting." Houston Chronicle. Saturday August 24, 1991. A25.
 www.FloridaRedistricting.org
 
 
The Redistricting Game - Where Do You Draw the Lines A simulation of how redistricting works. It uses the real US laws and practices and incorporates quotes from US political leaders.
Equal Population in Redistricting includes definition of equal population criteria  from ACE Projects